The Peace of Olomouc was signed on 2 April 1479 between Matthias Corvinus of Hungary and King Vladislaus II of Bohemia (and Hungary, later), bringing the Bohemian–Hungarian War (1468–1478) to an end. On 21 July 1479 the agreement was ratified during the course of festivities in Olomouc. This treaty, overall, ratified all terms within the Treaty of Brno developed in March 1478 (with slight modifications made by the King of Hungary on 20 September 1478). Based on the terms of the treaty, Vladislaus would cede the territories of Moravia, Silesia, and Lusatia to Corvinus. If Matthias perished, then Vladislaus was permitted to redeem these lands for 400,000 florins. Moreover, both monarchs would be permitted to utilize the title King of Bohemia. However, only Matthias was required to address the other claimant as the King of Bohemia.

See also
 List of treaties
 Treaty of Brno (1478)

References

Sources
 Engel, Pál (translated by Tamas Palosfalvi). The Realm of St Stephen: A History of Medieval Hungary, 895-1526. I.B. Tauris, 2005. . 

Olomouc
1470s treaties
Olomouc
Treaties of the Kingdom of Bohemia
15th century in Bohemia
15th century in Hungary
1470s in the Holy Roman Empire
1479 in Europe